1409 (Meteorological) Flight was formed on 1 April 1943 to provide meteorological information for RAF Bomber Command and the USAAF.  Equipped with unarmed de Havilland Mosquito aircraft, the crews of the Flight undertook long range meteorological reconnaissance flights until the end of the Second World War in Europe and continued in this role until 1946.

Formed at RAF Oakington as part of the disbandment of 521 Squadron, the Flight was part of No. 8 Group RAF, the Pathfinders.  Flying singly the missions were codenamed PAMPA (Photo-recce And Meteorological Photography Aircraft).

In January 1944 the Flight moved to RAF Wyton where it remained until July 1945 when it moved to RAF Upwood.  In October 1945 the Flight was transferred to No. 47 Group RAF and partially re-equipped with Consolidated Liberator aircraft in addition to its Mosquitos at RAF Lyneham.  The Flight was disbanded at Lyneham in May 1946.

During the war the Flight flew 1,364 operations for a loss of only 3 aircraft.

Stations
 RAF Oakington: 1 April 1943 – January 1944
 RAF Wyton: January 1944 – 4 July 1945
 RAF Upwood: 4 July 1945 – 10 October 1945
 RAF Lyneham: 10 October 1945 – 13 May 1946

See also
List of RAF Squadron Codes

References

1944 meteorology
Atmospheric sounding
Military units and formations established in 1943
Military units and formations disestablished in 1946
Military units and formations of the Royal Air Force in World War II
1409 Flight